Sarah Louise Waters is a British applied mathematician whose research interests include biological fluid mechanics, tissue engineering, and their applications in medicine. She is a professor of applied mathematics in the Mathematical Institute at the University of Oxford, a Fellow of St Anne's College, Oxford, and a Leverhulme Trust Senior Research Fellow of the Royal Society.

Waters completed her Ph.D. at the University of Leeds in 1996. Her dissertation, Coronary artery haemodynamics: pulsatile flow in a tube of time-dependent curvature, was supervised by Tim Pedley. She was named a professor at Oxford in 2014.

In 2012 she won a Whitehead Prize "for her contributions to the fields of physiological fluid mechanics and the biomechanics of artificially engineered tissues".

In 2019, Waters was elected a fellow of the American Physical Society.

References

External links
Home page

Year of birth missing (living people)
Living people
British mathematicians
Women mathematicians
Alumni of the University of Leeds
Fellows of St Anne's College, Oxford
Fellows of the American Physical Society